The Eastern Zone was one of the three regional zones of the 1978 Davis Cup.

11 teams entered the Eastern Zone, with 7 teams competing in the preliminary round to join the previous year's semifinalists in the main draw. India and Indonesia received byes into the quarterfinals, while Australia and New Zealand received byes into the semifinals. The winner of the main draw went on to compete in the Inter-Zonal Zone against the winners of the Americas Zone and Europe Zone.

Australia defeated New Zealand in the final and progressed to the Inter-Zonal Zone.

Preliminary rounds

Draw

First round
Philippines vs. Thailand

Japan vs. Chinese Taipei

Pakistan vs. Malaysia

Qualifying round
Philippines vs. Japan

South Korea vs. Pakistan

Main draw

Draw

Quarterfinals
Japan vs. Indonesia

India vs. South Korea

Semifinals
Japan vs. Australia

India vs. New Zealand

Final
Australia vs. New Zealand

References

External links
Davis Cup official website

Davis Cup Asia/Oceania Zone
Eastern Zone
Davis Cup
Davis Cup
Davis Cup
Davis Cup